The Robert Hodge House, also known as Sullivan Farm House, is a ca. 1900 Queen Anne and Colonial Revival house in Franklin, Tennessee.

It was listed on the National Register of Historic Places in 2005.

The property's listing is identified by the National Register as consistent with historic resource standards covered in a 1988 study of Williamson County historical resources.

References

Houses on the National Register of Historic Places in Tennessee
Houses in Franklin, Tennessee
Queen Anne architecture in Tennessee
Colonial Revival architecture in Tennessee
Houses completed in 1900
National Register of Historic Places in Williamson County, Tennessee